Charkhab or Char Khab or Charkh Ab may refer to:
 Charkhab, Kermanshah
 Char Khab, Yazd